Isoperla similis, the black stripetail, is a species of green-winged stonefly in the family Perlodidae. It is found in North America.

References

Further reading

 
 
 
 
 
 
 
 
 

Perlodidae
Insects described in 1861